The Monkees Present (full title being The Monkees Present Micky, David, Michael, also known as simply Present) is the Monkees' eighth album. It is the second Monkees album released after the departure of Peter Tork and the last to feature Michael Nesmith until 1996's Justus.

History

The original plan for Present was to release a double album which devoted one side to each member of the group, who by now were recording virtually as solo artists. With Tork now gone, and record sales waning, the decision was made to pare the track selection down to a single disc.

By the time recording had begun in earnest for Present, the Monkees had passed their commercial peak. As Screen Gems' interest in the Monkees' activities waned, the members were given more control over the creation of the album. Unlike Instant Replay, all but two songs were recorded in 1968 or 1969, and the album was accompanied by a strong advertising push (including a cross promotion with Kool-Aid) and a tour with Sam & The Goodtimers — a seven-piece R&B backing band. This was the Monkees' last attempt at commercial viability, reaching only  on the Billboard chart. Shortly after the album's release, Nesmith announced that he was leaving the Monkees to form his own group, the First National Band.

The title of "Good Clean Fun", which bears no relation to the lyrics, was a direct response to a music publisher (believed to be Lester Sill) who told Michael Nesmith that, in order to have hits, he would have to write songs that were "good clean fun".

Nesmith's "Hollywood", as well as Boyce and Hart's "Apples, Peaches, Bananas and Pears" and "(My) Storybook of You", were songs that were considered for the album but ultimately rejected.

Track listing

Original 1969 Colgems vinyl issue

Side 1

Side 2

Notes

All tracks except "Never Tell a Woman Yes," "Ladies Aid Society," "Mommy and Daddy" and "Pillow Time" were featured on the CBS and ABC reruns of The Monkees from 1969 to 1972.

1994 Rhino CD reissue

Tracks 1-12: Original album

2013 Rhino Handmade deluxe CD reissue

Disc 1 (The Original Stereo Album and More)
Tracks 1-12: Original album in stereo

"Time and Time Again" (November 1969 Stereo Mix) (Jones, Chadwick) - 2:37
 "Down the Highway" (November 1969 Stereo Mix) (Carole King, Toni Stern) - 2:16
 "Steam Engine" (November 1969 Stereo Mix) (Chip Douglas) - 2:23
 "If You Have the Time" (November 1969 Stereo Mix) (Jones, Chadwick) - 2:06
 "Angel Band" (November 1969 Stereo Mix) (William Bradbury, Reverend J. Hascall) - 3:25
 "Rose Marie" (November 1969 Stereo Mix) (Dolenz)  - 2:12
 "I Never Thought It Peculiar" (No Strings and Backing Vocals - August 1969) (Boyce, Hart) - 2:24
 "Of You" (November 1969 Stereo Mix) (Bill Chadwick, John Chadwick) - 2:00
 "Kicking Stones" (1969 Mix) (Lynn Castle, Wayne Erwin) - 2:27
 "If I Knew" (Bill & Davy's Stereo Mix) (Jones, Chadwick) - 2:21
 "The Crippled Lion" (November 1969 Stereo Mix) (Nesmith) - 2:49
 "(My) Storybook of You" (Tommy & Bobby's Stereo Mix) (Boyce, Hart) - 2:48
 "Carlisle Wheeling" (November 1969 Stereo Mix) (Nesmith) - 3:17
 "French Song" (LP Master with Alternate ending - Stereo) (Chadwick) - 2:48
 "Hollywood" (Stereo) (Nesmith) - 2:18
 "(My) Storybook of You" ("New" 1969 Stereo Mix) (Boyce, Hart) - 3:01
 "Circle Sky" ("New" 1969 Stereo Mix) (Nesmith) - 2:34
 Kool-Aid spot - 2:03

Disc 2 (Mono Mixes and Rarities)
 The Monkees Present Radio Spot - 1:04
 "If I Knew" (TV Mix Mono) (Jones, Chadwick) - 2:23
 "Bye Bye Baby Bye Bye" (Mono) (Dolenz, Klein) - 2:16
 "Looking for the Good Times" (Mono) (Boyce, Hart) - 2:06
 "Ladies Aid Society" (1969 Mono Mix) (Boyce, Hart) - 2:42
 "Listen to the Band" (Single Mix) (Nesmith) - 2:33
 "French Song" (TV Mix Mono) (Chadwick) - 2:49
 "Mommy & Daddy" (1969 Mono Mix) (Dolenz) - 2:13
 "Circle Sky" (1969 "New" Mono Mix) (Nesmith) - 2:31
 "Penny Music" (TV Mix Mono) (Michael Leonard, Bobby Weinstein) - 2:41
 "Apples, Peaches, Bananas and Pears" (1969 Mono Mix)  (Boyce, Hart) - 2:17
 "Of You" (1969 Mono Mix) (Chadwick, Chadwick) - 2:02
 "I Never Thought It Peculiar" (1969 Mono Mix without Overdubs) (Boyce, Hart) - 2:25
 "Kicking Stones" (1969 Mono Mix) (Castle, Erwin) - 2:28
 "Listen to the Band" (LP Version True Mono Mix) (Nesmith) - 2:45
 "If You Have the Time" (1969 Mono Mix without Moog) (Jones, Chadwick) - 2:10
 "Midnight Train" (TV Mix Mono) (Dolenz) - 2:08
 "(My) Storybook of You" (Mono) (Boyce, Hart) - 2:48
 "Steam Engine" (Mono) (Douglas) - 2:20
 "Time and Time Again" (November 1969 Mono Mix) (Jones, Chadwick) - 2:44
 "Mommy & Daddy" (7/1/69) Stereo Mix 3 (Dolenz) - 2:11
 "I Never Thought It Peculiar" (September 1969 Mono Mix with Overdubs) (Boyce, Hart) - 2:27
 "Bye Bye Baby Bye" (July 1969 Stereo Mix) (Dolenz, Klein) - 2:28
 "If You Have the Time" (1969 Mono Mix with Moog) (Dolenz) - 2:09
 "Mommy & Daddy" (7/2/69) Stereo Mix (Dolenz) - 2:05
 "French Song" (Rough Mono Mix) (Chadwick) - 2:53
 Monkees Greatest Hits radio spot - 1:00

Disc 3 (Sessions)
 "Little Girl" (Take 7) (Dolenz) - 1:29
 "Calico Girlfriend" (Nesmith) - 2:48
 "If I Knew" (Take 11) (Jones, Chadwick) - 2:23
 "You're So Good" (Alternate Mix) (Robert Stone) - 3:01
 "Little Red Rider" (Alternate Mix) (Nesmith) - 3:26
 "If You Have the Time" (Take 4) (Jones, Chadwick)- 2:38
 Music Bridge: "We'll Be Back in a Minute" (Take 12) (Dolenz) - 0:29
 "Listen To The Band" (Alternate Stereo Mix) (Nesmith) - 2:48
 "French Song" (Take 3) (Chadwick) - 2:42
 "Mommy and Daddy" (May 13, 1969 Stereo Mix 9) (Dolenz) - 1:57
 "Thank You My Friend" (Backing track - Take 4) (Nesmith) - 3:42
 "Pillow Time" (Takes 8 & 9) (Scott, Willis) - 4:17
 "How Can I Tell You" (Jones, Chadwick) - 3:13
 "Steam Engine" (1969 Rough Stereo Mix) (Douglas) - 2:38
 "Time and Time Again" (Take 1) (Jones, Chadwick) - 2:50
 "Good Afternoon" (Take 14) (Unknown) - 2:34
 "Opening Night" (Charlie Smalls) - 3:44
 "Lynn Harper" (Backing track - Take 8) (Nesmith) - 3:15
 Music Bridge: "We'll Be Back in a Minute" (Take 18) (Dolenz) - 0:25
 "The Good Earth" (Alternate Take) (Ben Nisbet) - 2:03
 "London Bridge" (Backing track - Take 4) (David Gates) - 4:52
 Music Bridge: "We'll Be Back in a Minute" (version three) (Dolenz) - 0:28
 "A Bus That Never Comes" (Backing track - Take 9) (Jack Keller, Bob Russell) - 2:49
 "Omega" (Backing track - Take 8) (Nesmith) - 2:15
 "Thirteen Is Not Our Lucky Number" (Backing track) (Nesmith, Michael Cohen) - 2:39
 "Michigan Blackhawk" (Backing track - Take 4) (Nesmith) - 2:54
 "Little Tommy Blues" (Backing track - Take 5) (Tommy Griffin) - 3:53
 "Till Then" (Backing track - Take 2) (Eddie Seiler, Guy Ward, Sol Marcus) - 3:19

Vinyl 45

 "Good Clean Fun" (Alternate Mix with extra percussion) - 2:19
 "Mommy and Daddy" (7/10/69)" (Mono Mix) - 2:25

Session information
Little Girl
Written by Micky Dolenz
Arranged by Shorty Rogers
Lead vocal by Micky Dolenz
Backing vocals: Micky Dolenz and Coco Dolenz
Electric Guitar: Louie Shelton
Acoustic Guitar: Micky Dolenz
Bass: Ray Pohlman
Drums: Earl Palmer
Produced by Micky Dolenz
Recorded at RCA Victor Studios, Hollywood, August 14, 1969

Good Clean Fun
Written by Michael Nesmith
Lead vocal by Michael Nesmith
Guitar: Wayne Moss
Steel Guitar: Lloyd Green
Banjo: Bobby Thompson
Bass: Norbert Putnam
Drums: Jerry Carrigan
Percussion: Unknown
Piano: David Briggs
Violin: Buddy Spicher
Produced by Michael Nesmith
Recorded at RCA Victor Studios, Nashville, June 1, 1968, during sessions for Head (1968)

If I Knew
Written by Bill Chadwick and David Jones
Lead vocal by Davy Jones
Backing vocals: Davy Jones and Bill Chadwick
Acoustic Guitar: David Cohen
Bass: Max Bennett
Drums: Hal Blaine
Piano: Michel Rubini
Produced by Bill Chadwick and Davy Jones
Recorded at RCA Victor Studios, June 27, and Sunset Sound Recorders, Hollywood, July 1, 1969

Bye Bye Baby Bye Bye
Written by Micky Dolenz and Ric Klein
Arranged by Shorty Rogers
Lead vocal by Micky Dolenz
Backing vocals: Micky Dolenz, Davy Jones and unknown
Electric Guitar: Louie Shelton
Acoustic Guitar: Unknown
Banjo: James Burton
Bass: Joe Osborn
Drums: Hal Blaine
Harmonica: Tommy Morgan
Produced by Micky Dolenz
Recorded at RCA Victor Studios, Hollywood, July 16, 1969

Never Tell a Woman Yes
Written by Michael Nesmith
Lead vocal by Michael Nesmith
Acoustic Guitar: Michael Nesmith
Banjo: Al Casey
Bass: Joe Osborn
Drums: Hal Blaine
Produced by Michael Nesmith
Recorded at RCA Victor Studios, Hollywood, June 2, 1969

Looking for the Good Times
Written by Tommy Boyce and Bobby Hart
Lead vocal by Davy Jones
Harmony vocal: Micky Dolenz
Backing vocals: Tommy Boyce, Bobby Hart and Ron Hicklin
Guitar: Wayne Erwin, Gerry McGee and Louie Shelton
Acoustic Guitar: Tommy Boyce
Bass: Larry Taylor
Drums: Billy Lewis
Tambourine: Gene Estes
Organ: Bobby Hart
Produced by Tommy Boyce and Bobby Hart
Considered to be used in the Monkees' TV show, but the idea was dropped.
Recorded at RCA Victor Studios, Hollywood, October 26, 1966, during sessions for More of the Monkees (1967)

Ladies Aid Society
Written by Tommy Boyce and Bobby Hart
Lead vocal by Davy Jones
Backing vocals: Micky Dolenz, Tommy Boyce, Bobby Hart, Wayne Erwin and Ron Hicklin
Guitar: Wayne Erwin, Gerry McGee and Louie Shelton
Bass: Larry Taylor
Drums: Billy Lewis
Percussion: Emil Richards
Piano: Bobby Hart
Trumpet: Steve Huffsteter
Trombone: Gilbert Falco, Dick Hyde
Horn: Bob Jung and Don McGinnis
Produced by Tommy Boyce and Bobby Hart
Recorded at RCA Victor Studio B, Hollywood, August 23, 1966, during sessions for More of the Monkees

Listen to the Band
Written by Michael Nesmith
Arranged by Shorty Rogers (Horns only)
Lead vocal by Michael Nesmith
Electric Guitar: Michael Nesmith
Guitar: Wayne Moss, and Mike Saluzzi
Steel Guitar: Lloyd Green
Bass: Norbert Putnam
Drums: Jerry Carrigan
Percussion: Unknown
Piano: David Briggs
Keyboard: Michel Rubini
Harmonica: Charlie McCoy
Brass: Don McGinnis
Trumpet: Bud Brisbois, Buddy Childers and Ray Triscari
Trombone: Dick Nash
Tuba: John Kitzmiller
Produced by Michael Nesmith
Though not a huge hit at the time, the song has become a sort of theme for the group. Though Nesmith claims the lyrics weren't a plea to be judged on musical merit, people nonetheless chose to view them that way. Rhino records even chose the song's title as the name of the group's box set released in April 1991. Mike would later re-record it with his own group The First National Band. Incidentally, "Listen to the Band" was originally performed with Peter Tork on their NBC TV Special 33 1/3 Revolutions Per Monkee early that same year. That version differs greatly from the single or album release. The album mix of the song has a slightly longer organ bridge section than the single mix does.
Recorded at RCA Victor Studios, Nashville, June 1, and RCA Victor Studios, Hollywood, December 9, 1968, during sessions for Head and Instant Replay (1969)

French Song
Written by Bill Chadwick
Lead vocal by Davy Jones
Acoustic Guitar: Frank Bugbee and Louie Shelton
Bass: Max Bennett
Drums: Hal Blaine
Percussion: Emil Richards
Shaker: Emil Richards
Chimes: Emil Richards
Vibes: Emil Richards
Organ: Michel Rubini
Flute: Tim Weisberg
Produced by Bill Chadwick and Davy Jones
Recorded at RCA Victor Studios, Hollywood, June 27, and August 14, 1969

Mommy and Daddy
Written by Micky Dolenz
Arranged by Shorty Rogers
Lead vocal by Micky Dolenz
Backing vocals: Micky Dolenz and Coco Dolenz
Guitar: Dom DeMieri and Mike Saluzzi
Bass: Unknown
Piano: Micky Dolenz
Keyboard: Michel Rubini
Brass: Don McGinnis
Trumpet: Bud Brisbois, Buddy Childers and Ray Triscari
Trombone: Dick Nash
Tuba: John Kitzmiller
Unknown: Pat Coghlan
Produced by Micky Dolenz
The song finds Micky overtly tackling the political issue of the treatment of American Indians. The album version was dramatically toned down from the original, which also touched on drug use, war, sexual reproduction, social ignorance and the JFK assassination.
Recorded at RCA Victor Studios, Hollywood, December 9, 1968, during sessions for Instant Replay

Oklahoma Backroom Dancer
Written by Michael Martin Murphey
Lead vocal by Michael Nesmith
Guitar: Mike Deasy and Louie Shelton
Acoustic Guitar: Unknown
Bass: Max Bennett
Drums: Eddie Hoh
Tambourine: Unknown
Shaker: Unknown
Piano: Michel Rubini
Produced by Michael Nesmith
Recorded at RCA Victor Studios, Hollywood, May 27, 1969

Pillow Time
Written by Janelle Scott and Matt Willis
Arranged by Shorty Rogers
Lead vocal by Micky Dolenz
Electric Guitar: Louie Shelton
Acoustic Guitar: Micky Dolenz
Bass: Ray Pohlman
Drums: Earl Palmer
Produced by Micky Dolenz
Originally demoed during the sessions for Headquarters (1967)
Recorded at RCA Victor Studios, August 14, 1969

1994 bonus tracks session information

Calico Girlfriend Samba
Written by Michael Nesmith
Lead vocal by Michael Nesmith
Guitar: Louie Shelton and Al Casey
Bass: Joe Osborn
Drums: Hal Blaine
Bongos: Unknown
Cowbell: Unknown
Shaker: Unknown
Piano: Michel Rubini
Produced by Michael Nesmith
Recorded at RCA Victor Studios, Hollywood, May 29, 1969
Nesmith would re-record this for his 1970 album Magnetic South

The Good Earth
Vocals by Davy Jones
Produced by Davy Jones
A poem from a 1969 musical called "The Good Earth", recited by Jones without musical backing.
Originally recorded on a 1969 45 by Irish comedian Dave Allen.
No official writing credit was listed on the 1994 CD. However, the writer is credited on both Dave Allen's 45 and the deluxe edition of Present as Ben Nisbet.
Recorded in July 1969

Listen to the Band [Early Mix]
Produced by Michael Nesmith
Lacks many of the overdubs that were featured on the final album mix.
Recorded at RCA Victor Studios, Nashville, June 1, 1968

Mommy and Daddy [Early Mix]
Lead vocal by Micky Dolenz
Arranged by Shorty Rogers
Other personnel unknown
Produced by Micky Dolenz
The original recording of "Mommy and Daddy," with lyrics that were deemed too controversial to release in 1969
Recorded at Original Sound, Hollywood, August 1, 1968, during sessions for Head

The Monkees Present - Radio Promo
Spoken words: Unknown
Recording info unknown

Charts

Weekly charts

Singles

References

The Monkees albums
1969 albums
RCA Records albums
Rhino Records albums
Colgems Records albums